The 1962 SMU Mustangs football team represented Southern Methodist University (SMU) as a member of the Southwest Conference (SWC) during the 1962 NCAA University Division football season. Led by first-year head coach Hayden Fry, the Mustangs compiled an overall record of 2–8 with a conference mark of 2–5, placing seventh in the SWC.

Schedule

References

SMU
SMU Mustangs football seasons
SMU Mustangs football